Very Intense Tropical Cyclone Hary was the strongest tropical cyclone in the 2001–02 South-West Indian Ocean cyclone season. Developing on March 5 from the monsoon trough, the storm initially moved generally to the west and gradually intensified. With favorable conditions, Hary quickly intensified on March 7, developing an eye and well-defined outflow. After reaching an initial peak, the cyclone briefly weakened due to an eyewall replacement cycle, by which time the storm turned southwestward toward Madagascar.

After peaking, Hary weakened due to land interaction, and it struck Madagascar southeast of Antalaha. It was turning south over land, and as a result it quickly moved offshore. There were three deaths in the country, one of which from electrocution. There was locally heavy crop damage, and four bridges were destroyed. However, the damage was considered minimal, given the intensity of the storm. After affecting Madagascar, Hary accelerated to the southeast, and the eastern periphery of the circulation moved over Réunion. On the mountain peaks of the island, rainfall reached , although it was much less near the coast. The rainfall caused flooding, killing one person, and 20,000 people were left without power. Hary became extratropical on March 13, although its remnants continued for several days as a powerful mid-latitude storm.

Meteorological history

In early March 2002, tropical activity was minimal in the southern Indian Ocean, limited to an area of convection, or thunderstorms, located southwest of Diego Garcia along the monsoon. On March 4, a broad and elongated low pressure area developed within the system, although moderate wind shear in the region initially prevented significant development. The next day, the circulation became better defined, and after being nearly stationary for a few days, it began moving steadily to the west-southwest, due to a ridge to the southeast. On March 5, Météo-France (MFR) classified the system as a tropical disturbance, and later Tropical Depression 11. At 0000 UTC on March 6, the Joint Typhoon Warning Center (JTWC) initiated advisories on Tropical Cyclone 18S, and six hours later MFR upgraded the system to Moderate Tropical Storm Hary.

After becoming a tropical storm, Hary was located beneath an anticyclone and in an area of minimal wind shear. It turned to a general westward motion, with its convection wrapping into the center and developing into a central dense overcast. A ragged eye formed on March 7, which gradually became more organized. By that time, the storm had developed good outflow, and was in the midst of a period of rapid deepening. Early on March 8, MFR upgraded Hary to tropical cyclone status, and the storm became very compact, with gales extending only  from the center. While rounding the northwest edge of a ridge, Hary turned to the southwest late on March 8, toward the northeast coast of Madagascar. It was the first very intense tropical cyclone since Cyclone Hudah in 2000, and made Hary the strongest storm of the season.

While approaching the coast, the cyclone was turning toward the south, although its motion was not southerly enough to keep the storm offshore. The eye rapidly weakened before landfall, possibly due to another replacement cycle, and land interaction further deteriorated the storm. Subsequently, Hary turned more toward the south-southeast, steered by an approaching trough that increased wind shear. The cyclone stopped weakening, and the eye began redeveloping. Later that day, the combination of increasing wind shear and cooler waters weakened the cyclone, resulting in the cloud structure to deteriorate. After the circulation became fully exposed from the convection, MFR estimated Hary became extratropical around 1200 UTC on March 13. The circulation expanded greatly afterward as the storm continued generally to the southeast. It moved south of the 40th parallel south, and continued as a powerful storm in the westerlies.

Impact

On March 9, as Hary intensified to the northeast of Madagascar, officials in Antsiranana Province placed the area under a state of alert. Initially, communication difficulties prevented reports of damage from leaving the region. Despite the intensity of the storm, overall damage was minimal, and much less than predicted. Two bridges were destroyed each in Antalaha District and Fenoarivo Atsinanana. Further south in Toamasina, high winds downed telephone lines and cut communications. Hary destroyed a hospital, and along its path it severely damaged food crops. One person died from electrocution, and there were three deaths overall in the country.

Although the center of Cyclone Hary passed well to the west of Réunion, heavy rains associated with the storm caused significant flooding on the island. The cyclone began affecting the island when it was located over Madagascar, after the large circulation spread humid air to the area and produced heavy rainfall through orographic lift. These rains caused the Ravine du Chaudron to swell and flood nearby Saint-Denis. One person drowned after attempting to cross the swollen river. Several roads were washed out across the region, cutting off Cilaos from nearby areas. Hary also produced  waves during its passage. There was no major damage on Réunion, which was still recovering from the deadly Cyclone Dina two months prior. Rainfall from Hary spread to nearby Mauritius, although effects there were not as severe.

See also

 Tropical cyclones in 2002
 Weather of 2002
Tropical cyclones in the Mascarene Islands
Cyclone Gafilo – similarly intense cyclone that struck northeastern Madagascar in 2004
Cyclone Indlala – struck northeastern Madagascar in 2007

References

External links
 Joint Typhoon Warning Center (JTWC) .
 Météo France (RSMC La Réunion).
 World Meteorological Organization
 2001–02 Cyclone Season from Météo France

Hary
Hary
Hary
Hary
Hary
Hary